Joseph Vergel Riley (February 26, 1964 – September 27, 2007) was an American visual and plastic artist based in Dallas, Texas. A painter, sculptor, filmmaker, and special effects makeup artist, he made horror designs for latex masks and for films, such as the 2004 superhero film Blade: Trinity from Marvel Comics, as well as conceptual art for children's animated series, such as Nickelodeon's Jimmy Neutron: Boy Genius franchise from DNA Productions. He was also a notable part of the multimedia beginnings of the Church of the SubGenius as St. Joe Riley.

Biography

Life
Joseph Vergel Riley was born on February 26, 1964, in Dallas County, Texas, U.S. His father was Rev. George Vergel Riley (alive ) and his mother Robbie Jean Riley (August 16, 1927 – June 1, 2006). Joe Riley went to a career development high school in Dallas, Skyline High School, majoring in commercial art, graduated in 1982, and followed at college with stage craft classes and the video department.

Riley became an illustrator and painter, a designer and filmmaker, a storyboard and background artist in animation, as well as a movie special effects and prosthetic makeup artist. He also made videos and audio collages, and sometimes comics. His defining career move was deciding to stay in Dallas: in a 2004 interview, he explained about not moving to Los Angeles, "I really wasn't interested in going to a large pond and being a small fish. I liked the medium to small pond that Dallas was. [...] I wasn't concerned about working on big titled films. [...] It was the work that was the thing... the craft."

Riley was also part of the beginnings of the Church of the SubGenius in Dallas (see Works section) and a friend of its co-founder Ivan Stang. On his blog, Riley reminisced in 2006 about how Stang once gave him a tape of cult "kook" Francis E. Dec recordings that he lent to a friend who played it at a 1993 party in Dallas where Forrest Jackson heard it, leading to Jackson videotaping in 1995 the only documented encounter with the reclusive Dec. About his involvement with the Church, Riley was quoted by the Church's online zine The Stark Fist of Removal as saying: "I'm not into SubGenius for the religious aspect so much. I see the Church more as... genetic stuntmen."

Joe Riley died of a sudden and unexpected heart attack on September 27, 2007, at age 43. He was survived by his wife, Penny Lee Harris Riley.,  and his 9-year-old son Mitch (Mitchell Ian Riley).

Works
Eulogized by his friend Rev. Ivan Stang, co-founder of the Church of the SubGenius, as "one of the funniest, coolest, most talented, most patient fellows I have ever had the pleasure to know and work with", Riley was involved with the beginnings of the Church as "St. Joe Riley": he worked on the syndicated program Hour of Slack and most of the early SubGenius videos, including the 1991 SubGenius commercial for MTV; he provided key illustrations for Stang's books Revelation X (1994) and The SubGenius Psychlopaedia of Slack: The Bobliographon (2006), as well as cards for INWO: SubGenius (1997, an official supplement to the Steve Jackson Games card game Illuminati: New World Order); he designed the official face of SubGenius mythos entity NHGH, and made the Church's rubber masks of Dobbs and NHGH (also used in the MTV ad).

Riley produced bizarre masks and designs for Funko or Death Studios, and prosthetic makeup or designs for gore or horror movies, such as the Marvel Comics vampire movie Blade: Trinity (2004, New Line Cinema) as painter. Riley also worked as conceptual artist on children's properties: he collaborated to the remake of Mighty Joe Young (1998, Disney/Buena Vista) as post-production coordinator, and made designs for the children's animation franchises of Dallas-based production company DNA Productions, such as the Jimmy Neutron: Boy Genius feature (2001, Paramount) and TV series (2004, Nickelodeon) as conceptual and storyboard artist, or The Ant Bully (2006, Warner Bros.) as digital effects and background artist.

From May 1996-February 1999, Riley produced and hosted a Dallas, Texas, cable access clip show called The Hypnotic Eye, collecting and showcasing obscure film material, animation, trailers, commercials, and behind the scenes footage from other local cable access shows and film screening interviews. The series ran 12 episodes.

References

Sources
Main sources used for this article:
 DMN (2006). "Riley, Robbie Jean" (mother's obituary), The Dallas Morning News, June 4, 2006, via NewsBank — Pay article not accessed, but abstract provides middle name and family data.
 DMN (2007). "Riley, Joseph V." (obituary), The Dallas Morning News, September 30, 2007, via Legacy.com — Pay article not accessed, but abstract confirms name and dates.
 LLFHC (2007). [http://laureldallas.createatribute.com/registryMain.php?PHPSESSID=d9bee59a27af416a714c41272c59ea57&i_memorialid=1191162464 "Mr. Joseph V. Riley: February 26, 1964 - September 27, 2007" (online memorial)], Laurel Land Funeral Homes and Cemeteries, laureldallas.createatribute.com, consulted in March 2009 — Confirms dates and family.
 LMC (2004). "Life and Times of Riley" (interview) , Latex Mask Central, October 2004, 3 pages — Industry interview about his horror masks.
 Riley, Joe (2005).  – highlight text if displayed white on white), Riley's blog Men-Oo-She-A, May 7, 2005 — Wife and child data.
 Riley, Joe (2006).  – highlight text if displayed white on white), Riley's blog Men-Oo-She-A, August 19, 2006 — The Francis E. Dec anecdote.
 Stang, Ivan (2007). "St. Joe Riley" (eulogy), The Stark Fist of Removal, October 6, 2007

Further reading
 DMN (1997). "Tinsel 'Toon: Dallas animation firm finishes holiday special in the St. Nick of time", by Catherine Cuellar, The Dallas Morning News, December 13, 1997 — DNA Productions press clipping from a pay article about Santa vs. the Snowman 3D (1997, ABC), including on page 3C: "Dallas latex foam sculptor Joe Riley and production designer Dan Dudley created the rest of the eye-popping animation, such as the spooky Nutcracker, a security viewing portal for Santa's helpers and several snow beasts and vehicles, many of which suggest famous sci-fi film sets and characters. Brett Hester, a local graphic designer and former architecture student, then used computers to build and model virtual 3-D versions of the Riley and Dudley drawings."
 DNA Productions, press clippings (including Jimmy Neutron and Ant Bully): There may be more Riley coverage here, but because they are scanned images they can't be searched and have to be read entirely.

Notes

External links

Official
 Joe Riley on Myspace
 Joe Riley's blog Men-Oo-She-A at Blogger
 Joe Riley's art memorial at SubGenius.com
  at The Monster Lab, JavaScript required)

Filmographies
Some databases are shared but details vary and none is perfect:
 Joe Riley at Fancast (rather complete)
 Joe Riley at InBaseline
 Joe Riley at the New York Times/Baseline
 
 Joe Riley at Yahoo! Movies
 
  (very incomplete)

                   

1964 births
2007 deaths
Sculptors from Texas
Skyline High School (Dallas) alumni
People from Dallas County, Texas
American graphic designers
20th-century American painters
American male painters
21st-century American painters
21st-century American male artists
American illustrators
Background artists
American make-up artists
American filmmakers
American SubGenii
Special effects people
20th-century American sculptors
20th-century American male artists
American male sculptors